Swan Pool & The Swag is a 5.7 hectare (14 acre) biological site of Special Scientific Interest in the West Midlands in western-central England. The site was notified in 1986 under the Wildlife and Countryside Act 1981 and is currently managed by the Country Trust.

See also
List of Sites of Special Scientific Interest in the West Midlands

References

 Swan Pool & The Swag English Nature. Retrieved on 2008-05-24

Sites of Special Scientific Interest notified in 1986
Sites of Special Scientific Interest in the West Midlands (county)